All Saints Church, or All Saints' Church or variations on the name may refer to:

Albania
All Saints' Church, Himarë

Australia
All Saints Church, Canberra, Australian Capital Territory 
All Saints Anglican Church, Henley Brook, Western Australia
All Saints Anglican Church, Brisbane, Queensland
All Saints Anglican Church, Hindmarsh, Adelaide, now Holden Street Theatres

Barbados
All Saints Chapel of Ease (Anglican)

Bosnia and Herzegovina
All Saints Church, Livno

Brazil
All Saints' Church, Santos, São Paulo state

Canada
All Saints Church (Hamilton, Ontario)

China
All Saints' Church, Tianjin

Czech Republic
All Saints Church (Prague Castle)

Germany 
 All Saints Church, Dresden
 All Saints' Church, Erfurt
 Allerheiligen-Hofkirche, Munich
 Kreuzkirche, Munich
 All Saints' Church, Wittenberg

India
All Saints Church, Srinagar
All Saints Syro Malabar Church, Koppam Vithura
All Saints Church (Secunderabad)
All Saints Church, Pune
All Saint's Church, Jaipur, designed by Samuel Swinton Jacob

Indonesia
All Saints Church, Jakarta

Ireland
All Saints Church, Carnew, County Wicklow
All Saints Church, Grangegorman, Dublin
All Saints' Church, Raheny, Dublin

Italy
All Saints' Church, Rome
Ognissanti, Florence

Malaysia
All Saints' Church, Taiping, Perak

New Zealand
All Saints Church, Howick, Auckland
All Saints' Church, Dunedin
All Saints Church, Palmerston North

Nigeria
All Saint's Parish Church, Ikosi

Pakistan
All Saints Church, Peshawar

Poland
All Saints Church, Warsaw

Russia
Church of All Saints, Moscow
Church of All Saints, Yekaterinburg

South Africa
All Saints Church, Maidstone, KwaZulu-Natal
All Saints Church, Uniondale, Western Cape

Spain
All Saints' Church, Puerto de la Cruz, North Tenerife, Canary Islands

Sri Lanka
All Saints' Church, Galle
All Saints' Church, Borella

Sweden
All Saints Church, Gothenburg
All Saints Church, Lund

Ukraine
Church of All Saints, Chernihiv

United Kingdom

England

Bedfordshire
Church of All Saints, Campton
Church of All Saints, Houghton Regis
Church of All Saints, Leighton Buzzard
Church of All Saints, Odell, Bedfordshire

Berkshire
All Saints' Church, Maidenhead
All Saints' Church, Reading

Bristol
All Saints' Church, Bristol

Buckinghamshire
All Saints Church, Bow Brickhill, Milton Keynes
All Saints Church, Lathbury, Milton Keynes
All Saints Church, Loughton, Milton Keynes
All Saints' Church, Wing, Aylesbury Vale

Cambridgeshire
All Saints' Church, Cambridge
All Saints Church, Conington

Cornwall
All Saints' Church, Bryher
All Saints Church, Marazion

Cheshire
All Saints Church, Church Lawton
All Saints' Church, Daresbury
St Mary and All Saints' Church, Great Budworth
All Saints Church, Great Saughall
All Saints Church, Handley
All Saints Church, Harthill
All Saints' Church, Hoole, Chester 
All Saints Church, Marple
All Saints' Church, Runcorn
All Saints Church, Scholar Green
All Saints Church, Siddington
All Saints Chapel, Somerford
All Saints Church, Thelwall
All Saints' Church, Weston, Cheshire

Cumbria
All Saints Church, Bolton
All Saints Church, Boltongate
All Saints Church, Burton in Lonsdale
All Saints Church, Orton
All Saints Church, Lupton
All Saints Church, Scaleby

Derbyshire
All Saints' Church, Aston-upon-Trent
All Saints Church, Ballidon
All Saints' Church, Bakewell
All Saints' Church, Breadsall
All Saints' Church, Lullington
All Saints Church, Kedleston

Dorset 

 All Saints Church, Branksome
 All Saints' Church, Chalbury
 All Saints Church, Dorchester
 All Saints Church, Hampreston
 All Saints' Church, Mapperton
 All Saints Church, Nether Cerne
 All Saints Church, Portland
 All Saints' Church, Southbourne
 All Saints' Church, Stour Row
 All Saints' Church, Tarrant Keyneston
 All Saints Church, Wyke Regis

East Midlands
All Saints' Church, Oakham

East Sussex
All Saints Church, Hastings
All Saints Church, Heathfield
All Saints Church, Hove
All Saints Church, Hurstmonceaux
All Saints Church, Patcham

Essex
All Saints Church, Creeksea
All Saints Church, East Horndon
All Saints Church, Maldon
All Saints Church, Vange

Gloucestershire
All Saints' Church, Cheltenham
All Saints Church, Selsley
All Saints Church, Shorncote

Hampshire
All Saints' Church, Alton
All Saints' Church, Bassett
All Saints Church, Crondall
All Saints Church, East Meon
All Saints' Church, Fawley
All Saints Church, Little Somborne
All Saints Church, Minstead
All Saints Church, Odiham
All Saints' Church, Southampton

Hertfordshire
All Saints' Church, Hertford
All Saints' Church, Hockerill

Isle of Wight
All Saints' Church, Calbourne
All Saints' Church, Freshwater
All Saints' Church, Godshill
All Saints' Church, Gurnard
All Saints' Church, Newchurch
All Saints' Church, Ryde

Kent
All Saints' Church, Boughton Aluph, near Ashford
All Saints Church, Brenchley, near Royal Tunbridge Wells
All Saints Church, Frindsbury
Hope Church of All Saints
All Saints Church, Lydd
All Saints Church, Maidstone
All Saints' Church, Shuart
All Saints Church, Snodland
All Saints Church, Staplehurst
All Saints Church, Sutton (Kent)
All Saints Church, Ulcombe
All Saints Church, Waldershare
All Saints Church, Westbere
All Saints Church, West Stourmouth

Lancashire
All Saints Church, Hesketh Bank
All Saints Church, Higher Walton
All Saints Church, Preston
All Saints' Church, Urmston

Leicestershire
All Saints Church, Beeby
All Saints Church, Dunton Bassett
All Saints Church, Gilmorton
All Saints Church, Leicester
All Saints Church, Long Whatton
All Saints Church, Loughborough
All Saints Church, Narborough
All Saints Church, Scraptoft
All Saints Church, Swinford
All Saints Church, Wigston Magna

Lincolnshire
All Saints Church, Barrowby
Old All Saints Church, Great Steeping
All Saints Church, Haugham
All Saints Church, Saltfleetby
All Saints Church, Theddlethorpe
All Saints Church, Winterton

London
All Saints Church, Benhilton, Sutton
All Saints' Blackheath
All Saints, Camden Town
All Saints, Chingford
All Saints Church, East Sheen
All Saints' Church, Edmonton
All Saints Church, Fulham
All Saints' Church, Isleworth
All Saints Church, Harrow Weald
All Saints Church, Ennismore Gardens, Knightsbridge
All Saints Church, Kingston upon Thames
All Saints, Margaret Street
All Saints Notting Hill
All Saints' Church, Oakleigh Park, Barnet
All Saints Church, Peckham
All Saints' Church, Putney Common
All Saints Church, Poplar
All Saints Church, Tufnell Park
All Saints Church, Twickenham
All Saints Church, Wandsworth
All Saints Church, West Dulwich
All Saints Church, West Ham

Merseyside
All Saints' Church, Childwall
All Saints Church, Speke, Liverpool
All Saints' Church, St Helens, Sutton, St Helens
All Saints Church, Thornton Hough

Norfolk
All Saints Church, Ashwicken
All Saints Church, Billockby
All Saints Church, Boughton
All Saints Church, Cockley Cley
All Saints Church, Croxton
All Saints Church, Hargham
All Saints Church, Hilgay
All Saints Church, Narborough
All Saints Church, Newton by Castle Acre
All Saints Church, North Runcton
All Saints Church, Old Buckenham
All Saints Church, Shipdham
All Saints Church, Shouldham
All Saints Church, Snetterton
All Saints Church, South Lynn
All Saints Church, Stoke Ferry
All Saints Church, Thurgarton
All Saints Church, Walsoken
All Saints Church, West Harling
All Saints Church, Wilby
All Saints Church, Wretton

Northamptonshire
All Saints Church, Aldwincle
All Saints' Church, Barnwell
All Saints' Church, Brixworth
All Saints' Church, Earls Barton
All Saints Church, Holdenby
All Saints' Church, Northampton
All Saints Church, Wellingborough

Nottinghamshire
 All Saints' Church, Nottingham
 All Saints' Church, Syerston
 All Saints' Church, Thrumpton
 All Saints' Church, Weston, Nottinghamshire

Oxfordshire
All Saints Church, Oxford
All Saints Church, Shirburn
All Saints' Church, Sutton Courtenay

Shropshire
All Saints Church, Berrington
All Saints Church, Claverley

Somerset
Church of All Saints, Alford
All Saints Church, Dodington
Church of All Saints, East Pennard
Church of All Saints, Kingston Seymour
Church of All Saints, Long Ashton, a Grade II* listed building in North Somerset
Church of All Saints, Langport
Church of All Saints, Lullington
Church of All Saints, Martock
Church of All Saints, Monksilver
Church of All Saints, Nunney
Church of All Saints, Nynehead
Church of All Saints, Publow
Church of All Saints, Selworthy
Church of All Saints, Sutton Bingham
Church of All Saints, Trull
Church of All Saints, West Camel
All Saints' Church, Weston, Somerset
All Saints Church, Woolley
Church of All Saints, Wootton Courtenay
All Saints Church, Wraxall
Church of All Saints, Wrington

Staffordshire
All Saints Church, Balterley
All Saints' Church, Leek
All Saints' Church, Madeley

Suffolk
 All Saints Church, Easton
All Saints Church, Ellough
All Saints' Church, Icklingham
All Saints Church, Little Wenham
All Saints Church, Newmarket
All Saints Church, Newton Green
All Saints Church, South Elmham
All Saints Church, Wordwell
All Saints Church, Wickhambrook

Surrey
All Saints Church, Carshalton
All Saints Church, Oxted

Tyne and Wear
All Saints' Church, Monkwearmouth
All Saints' Church, Newcastle upon Tyne

Warwickshire
All Saints Church, Billesley
All Saints Church, Chadshunt
All Saints Church, Leamington Spa
All Saints Church, Weston-on-Avon

West Midlands
 All Saints' Church, Small Heath (I)
 All Saints' Church, Small Heath (II)
 St Mary & All Saints, Walsall

West Sussex
All Saints Church, Buncton
All Saints Church, Highbrook
All Saints Church, Roffey

Wiltshire
All Saints Church, Alton Priors
All Saints Church, Idmiston
All Saints Church, Lydiard Millicent
The Church of All Saints, Maiden Bradley

Worcestershire 
All Saints Church, Evesham
Church of All Saints, Wilden

Yorkshire
Church of All Saints, Aston cum Aughton, South Yorkshire
All Saints Church, Arksey, Arksey, South Yorkshire
All Saints' Church, Barwick-in-Elmet, West Yorkshire
All Saints' Church, Batley, West Yorkshire
Church of All Saints, Bingley, West Yorkshire
All Saints' Church, Bramham, West Yorkshire
All Saints' Church, Brompton-by-Sawdon, North Yorkshire
St John and All Saints' Church, Easingwold, North Yorkshire
All Saints Church, Ecclesall, Sheffield
Church of All Saints, Great Ayton, North Yorkshire
All Saints' Church, Harewood, West Yorkshire
All Saints' Church, Normanton, West Yorkshire
All Saints' Church, Northallerton, North Yorkshire
Church of All Saints, Pocklington, East Riding of Yorkshire 
All Saints Church, Rotherham, South Yorkshire, now Rotherham Minster
All Saints' Church, Rufforth, York
Old All Saints Church, Skelton-in-Cleveland, North Yorkshire
Church of All Saints, Silkstone
All Saints Church, Thorpe Bassett, North Yorkshire
All Saints' Church, Totley, Sheffield
All Saints' Church, Upper Poppleton, York
All Saints' Church, Yafforth, North Yorkshire
All Saints' Church, North Street, York
All Saints' Church, Pavement, York
All Saints Church, Woodlands, South Yorkshire

Wales 
All Saints Church, Ammanford
All Saints Church, Deganwy, Caernarfonshire
All Saints' Church, Gresford, Wrexham
All Saints Church, Higher Kinnerton, Flintshire
All Saints Church, Kemeys Commander, Monmouthshire
All Saints' Church, Oystermouth

Scotland
All Saints Church, Glencarse, Perthshire
All Saints' Church, St Andrews, Fife

United States 
All Saint's Church (Oracle, Arizona)
All Saints Episcopal Church (Pasadena, California)
All Saints Church of Eben Ezer, Brush, Colorado
All Saints' Episcopal Church (Atlanta), Georgia
All Saints Catholic Church (Taylorsville, Kentucky)
All Saints Episcopal Church (Chicago), Illinois
Episcopal Church of All Saints (Indianapolis), Indiana
Church of All Saints (Keokuk, Iowa)
All Saints Catholic Church (Stuart, Iowa)
All Saints' Church (Easton, Maryland)
All Saints' Church (Sunderland, Maryland)
All Saints Church at Monie, Venton, Maryland
All Saints' Church — Ashmont (Boston), Massachusetts
All Saints Church-Episcopal, Northfield, Minnesota
All Saints Church (Peterborough, New Hampshire)
All Saint's Memorial Church (Navesink, New Jersey)
All Saints Roman Catholic Church (Buffalo, New York)
All Saints Church (Manhattan), New York City, a NYC landmark
All Saints Anglican Church (Raleigh, North Carolina)
All Saints Antiochian Orthodox Church, Raleigh, North Carolina
All Saints Catholic Church (Cincinnati, Ohio)
All Saints Catholic Church (New Riegel, Ohio)
All Saints Catholic Church (Houston), Texas

See also 
 All Saints Anglican Church (disambiguation)
 All Saints Episcopal Church (disambiguation)
 All Saints Cathedral (disambiguation)
 All Saints Chapel (disambiguation)
 All Saints' Abbey (Baden-Württemberg)